Photinus stellaris is a species in the family Lampyridae ("fireflies"), in the suborder Polyphaga ("water, rove, scarab, long-horned, leaf and snout beetles").
It is found in North America.

References

Further reading
 Arnett, R.H. Jr., M. C. Thomas, P. E. Skelley and J. H. Frank. (eds.). (2002). American Beetles, Volume II: Polyphaga: Scarabaeoidea through Curculionoidea. CRC Press LLC, Boca Raton, FL.
 Arnett, Ross H. (2000). American Insects: A Handbook of the Insects of America North of Mexico. CRC Press.
 McDermott, F. A. / Steel, W. O., ed. (1966). "Lampyridae". Coleopterorum Catalogus Supplementa, pars 9, 149.
 Richard E. White. (1983). Peterson Field Guides: Beetles. Houghton Mifflin Company.

External links
NCBI Taxonomy Browser, Photinus stellaris

Lampyridae
Bioluminescent insects